Be Careful What You Wish For is the fourth novel in Jeffrey Archer's Clifton Chronicles. It was published on 13 March 2014.

Plot
Be Careful What You Wish For follows the Barrington-Clifton family during the years 1957 to 1964, when Emma Barrington Clifton seeks to take control of her family shipping business and must deal with conspiracies and sabotage.  Don Pedro Martinez tries to get his own candidate to lead the company, and Yorkshire banker Cedric Hardcastle joins the board.

Sequel
There will be seven books in the Clifton Chronicles instead of the initial five as was earlier intended. This is due to the fact that Archer felt that he could not end the series without suddenly killing Harry Clifton, the protagonist of the series so he decided to extend the series. The next book, Mightier Than the Sword will be published on 24 February 2015 and Archer has stated that Margaret Thatcher will make an appearance.

References

Novels by Jeffrey Archer
2014 British novels
Macmillan Publishers books